Aleksey Pereveqzev (born 20 July 1949) is an Azerbaijani former long jumper, born in Baku, who competed in the 1976 Summer Olympics.

References

1949 births
Living people
Sportspeople from Baku
Azerbaijani male long jumpers
Soviet male long jumpers
Olympic athletes of the Soviet Union
Athletes (track and field) at the 1976 Summer Olympics
Universiade medalists in athletics (track and field)
Universiade bronze medalists for the Soviet Union
Medalists at the 1975 Summer Universiade